The Adventures of Sajo and her Beaver People is a 1935 children's adventure novel, written and illustrated by Canadian author Grey Owl. It was based on real-life events. The novel became a bestseller, and contributed to drawing half a million people to Grey Owl's lectures in the late 1930s. Within five years of its publication, it was translated into many European languages, including Polish and Russian.

Plot
Sajo, a young Ojibwe Indian girl, and her older brother adopt two young beavers, Chilawee and Chikanee, and try to save them from fur traders.

Notes

External links
 
 The Adventures of Sajo and her Beaver People at the GoodReads.com

1935 American novels
Canadian adventure novels
Canadian children's books
Children's historical novels
Children's novels about animals
Environmental fiction books
Fictional beavers
First Nations novels
Western (genre) novels
1935 children's books